Constant is a surname. Notable people with the surname include:

Benjamin Constant (1767–1830), Swiss-born thinker, writer and French politician
Benjamin Constant (Brazil) (1836–1891), Brazilian military man and political thinker
David Constant (born 1941), international cricket umpire
Edward Constant II (born c. 1942), American historian
Emmanuel Constant (bishop) (1928–2009), Roman Catholic Haitian bishop
Emmanuel Constant (born 1956), founder of FRAPH
F. Woodbridge Constant (1904–1988), American physicist
Jean-Joseph Benjamin-Constant, (1845 – 1902), French painter
Marius Constant (1925–2004), Romanian-born French composer
Paul-Henri-Benjamin d'Estournelles de Constant (1852–1924), French diplomat and politician
Pete Constant (born 1963), American politician
Kevin Constant (born 1987), Guinean footballer

See also
Constance (name)
Constant (given name)
Constant-Désiré
Benjamin-Constant
Benoît-Constant
Saint-Constant (disambiguation)